Tomás Medina Menéndez (June 1803 – February 1884) was provisional President of El Salvador 1–3 February 1848.

Mr. Medina began his public life in 1833 being elected to the Assembly and then senator till 1848. February of the same year he received the Presidency of the Republic as senator until the vice president, José Félix Quirós, took over the presidency.

In 1852 he was elected Vice President of El Salvador for 2 years under President Francisco Dueñas. The testimony is No. 34 of the Gaceta Oficial, 30 January of that election with the words, "Yesterday it was declared Constitutional President by popular election, Mr. Lic. don Francisco Dueñas y Vice President designate conformed with the law Mr. don Tomás Medina."

References

Presidents of El Salvador
Vice presidents of El Salvador
1803 births
1884 deaths
People from Santa Ana Department
19th-century Salvadoran people